The 1993 New Zealand general election was held on 6 November 1993 to determine the composition of the 44th New Zealand Parliament. Voters elected 99 members to the House of Representatives, up from 97 members at the 1990 election. The election was the last general election to use the first-past-the-post electoral system, with all members elected from single-member electorates.

The election saw the governing National Party, led by Jim Bolger, win a second term in office, despite a major swing away from National in both seats and votes. The opposition Labour Party, despite a slight drop in their support, managed to make gains in terms of seats. The new Alliance and New Zealand First parties gained significant shares of the vote, but won few seats.

Background
Before the election, the National Party governed with 64 seats, while the opposition Labour Party held only 29. The 1990 election had been a major victory for the National Party, with the unpopular Fourth Labour Government being decisively defeated. The Labour Party had become unpopular for its ongoing economic reforms, which were based around liberalisation, privatisation, and the removal of tariffs and subsidies. The National Party divided as to the merits of the reforms, with conservatives generally opposed and libertarians generally in favour. The party had fought the 1990 election saying that the Labour government's program was too radical, and was being carried out without any thought of the social consequences – Jim Bolger spoke about "the Decent Society", promising a return to a more moderate and balanced platform. Once in government, however, the key Minister of Finance role was taken not by a moderate but by Ruth Richardson, who wished to expand, not end, the economic reforms. Many of the voters who had felt betrayed by Labour's reforms now felt betrayed by the National Party as well. By September 1991, support for National had plummeted to a hitherto unprecedented polling low of 22%.

The Alliance, the largest "third party", was a broad coalition of five smaller groups – the NewLabour Party (a Labour splinter), the Democrats (a social credit party), the Greens (an environmentalist party), Mana Motuhake (a Māori party), and the Liberal Party (a National splinter). The Alliance held three seats in Parliament – one belonged to Jim Anderton, who had been re-elected under a NewLabour banner in the seat he had formerly held for Labour, while the other two belonged to the National MPs who formed the Liberal Party. In its first electoral test, the 1992 by-election in Tamaki, the Alliance had performed well, taking second place. Another smaller group was New Zealand First, a party established by former National MP Winston Peters. Peters had broken with his party after a number of policy disputes with its leadership, and resigned from parliament to contest his seat as an independent. After being overwhelmingly re-elected, Peters established New Zealand First to promote his views. Peters was the party's sole MP.

Another consequence of dissatisfaction with both major parties was the referendum conducted alongside the 1993 election. The culmination of the larger decade-long New Zealand electoral reform process, the referendum was held following the September 1992 indicative referendum, which saw 85% of voters voting for change from the existing First Past The Post (FPP) system, and 70% choosing the Mixed Member Proportional (MMP) as its preferred replacement: a proportional system which would make it easier for smaller parties to win seats. It asked voters to choose whether to keep the existing FPP system or change to MMP, with 53.9% of voters opting to change to MMP.

While National and Labour usually stood candidates in every seat, National was one candidate short as their Southern Maori candidate apparently did not apply in time.

MPs retiring in 1993
Four MPs, including three National MPs and one Labour MP, intended to retire at the end of the 43rd Parliament.

The election
The election was held on 6 November. 2,321,664 people were registered to vote, and 85.2% turned out. This turnout was almost exactly the same as for the previous election, although slightly less than what would be seen for the following one.

Summary of results
Preliminary results based on election night counts saw the country facing its first hung parliament since 1931, with no party gaining the 50 seats required for a majority. The National Party won 49 seats, a drop of 15 from before the election, and Labour had won 46 seats, with the balance of power held with the Alliance and New Zealand First, which won two seats each. This led to Jim Bolger saying on public television, "Bugger the pollsters", as polls had predicted a comfortable National victory. Bolger reacted to the election results by giving a conciliatory speech, while Labour leader Mike Moore delivered a speech later described by political scientist Jack Vowles as "damaging" and "more appropriate for a decisive Labour win than a narrow defeat."

On election night result with the two major parties tied, the Governor-General Dame Catherine Tizard asked her predecessor Sir David Beattie to form a committee, along with three retired appeal court judges, to decide whom to appoint as prime minister. However National won one more seat and was returned to power when the official count saw the seat of Waitaki swing from Labour to National, giving National 50 seats and Labour 45 seats. Labour's Sir Peter Tapsell agreed to become speaker of the New Zealand House of Representatives (so that National would not lose a vote in the house). Hence National had a majority of one seat.

The 1993–1996 parliamentary term would see a number of defections from both major parties, meaning that National would eventually be forced to make alliances to retain power.

Detailed results

Party totals

|colspan=7|
|-
! colspan=2 rowspan=2 width=200 |party
! rowspan=2 |votes
! colspan=2 |% of votes
! colspan=2 |seats
|- style="background-color:#E9E9E9; text-align:center"
! %
! change
! total
! change
|-
| 
| style="text-align:left;" |National
| style="text-align:right;" | 673,892
| style="text-align:right;" | 35.05
| style="text-align:right;" | -12.78
| style="text-align:right;" | 50
| style="text-align:right;" | -17
|-
| 
| style="text-align:left;" |Labour
| style="text-align:right;" | 666,759
| style="text-align:right;" | 34.68
| style="text-align:right;" | -0.46
| style="text-align:right;" | 45
| style="text-align:right;" | +16
|-
| 
| style="text-align:left;" |Alliance
| style="text-align:right;" | 350,064
| style="text-align:right;" | 18.21
| style="text-align:right;" | +3.93a
| style="text-align:right;" | 2
| style="text-align:right;" | +1b
|-
| 
| style="text-align:left;" |NZ First
| style="text-align:right;" | 161,481
| style="text-align:right;" | 8.40
| style="text-align:right;" | +8.4
| style="text-align:right;" | 2
| style="text-align:right;" | +2
|-
| 
| style="text-align:left;" |Christian Heritage
| style="text-align:right;" | 38,749
| style="text-align:right;" | 2.02
| style="text-align:right;" | +1.49
| style="text-align:right;" | 0
| style="text-align:right;" | –
|-
| 
| style="text-align:left;" |McGillicuddy Serious
| style="text-align:right;" | 11,706
| style="text-align:right;" | 0.61
| style="text-align:right;" | +0.06
| style="text-align:right;" | 0
| style="text-align:right;" | –
|-
| 
| style="text-align:left;" |Natural Law
| style="text-align:right;" | 6,056
| style="text-align:right;" | 0.31
| style="text-align:right;" | +0.31
| style="text-align:right;" | 0
| style="text-align:right;" | –
|-
| 
| style="text-align:left;" |Mana Māori
| style="text-align:right;" | 3,342
| style="text-align:right;" | 0.17
| style="text-align:right;" | +0.17
| style="text-align:right;" | 0
| style="text-align:right;" | –
|-
| 
| style="text-align:left;" |minor parties and independents
| style="text-align:right;" | 10,747
| style="text-align:right;" | 0.56
| style="text-align:right;" | +0.34
| style="text-align:right;" | 0
| style="text-align:right;" | –
|- style="background-color:#E9E9E9; text-align:right"
| colspan=2 style="text-align:center;" |total votes
| 1,922,796
| 100.00
|
| 99
| +2
|-
|colspan=2|
|
|colspan=6|
|- 
| style="text-align:center;" colspan=2 |total registered electors
| style="text-align:right;" |2,321,664
|colspan=4|
|-
|style="background-color:#E9E9E9;text-align:left;" colspan=2 |turnout
|style="background-color:#E9E9E9;text-align:right;" colspan=5 |82.82%
|}

Votes summary

Electorate results

The table below shows the results of the 1993 general election by electorate:

Key

|-
 |colspan=8 style="background-color:#FFDEAD" | General electorates
|-

|-
 | Hauraki
 | colspan=2 style="text-align:center; background-color:#ececec;" | New electorate
 | style="background-color:;" |
 | style="text-align:center;background-color:;" | Warren Kyd
 | style="text-align:right;" | 1,870
 | style="background-color:;" |
 | style="text-align:center;" | Jeanette Fitzsimons
|-

|-
 |colspan=8 style="background-color:#FFDEAD" | Māori electorates
|-

|}
Table footnotes:

Summary of changes
Based on the 1991 New Zealand census, an electoral redistribution was carried out; the last one had been carried out in 1987 based on the previous census in 1986. This resulted in the abolition of nine electorates, and the creation of eleven new electorates. Through an amendment in the Electoral Act in 1965, the number of electorates in the South Island was fixed at 25, so the new electorates increased the number of the North Island electorates by two. In the South Island, one electorate was abolished, and one electorate was recreated. In the North Island, five electorates were newly created (and ), five electorates were recreated (Hauraki, and ), and eight electorates were abolished (and ).

In many cases an MP from an abolished seat stood for, and was elected to a new one that broadly covered their previous electorate.

New electorates.
Eastern Bay of Plenty – most of the abolished East Cape seat, plus part of Tarawera. Won by former East Cape MP Tony Ryall.
Far North – most of the abolished Bay of Islands seat. Won by former Bay of Islands MP John Carter.
Franklin – part of the abolished Maramarua seat and part of Papakura. Won by former Maramarua MP Bill Birch.
Hauraki – parts of the abolished Clevedon, Maramarua, and Coromandel seats. Won by former Clevedon MP Warren Kyd.
Henderson – parts taken from the West Auckland, Te Atatu, and Titirangi electorates. Won by former West Auckland MP Jack Elder (Labour).
Howick – the eastern part of the Otara seat. Won by former Otara MP Trevor Rogers (National).
Matakana – part of the abolished Coromandel seat. Won by former Coromandel MP Graeme Lee.
Onslow – the core of the abolished Ohariu seat. Won by former Ohariu MP Peter Dunne (Labour).
Rakaia – the abolished Ashburton seat, plus part of the Selwyn seat. Won by former Ashburton MP Jenny Shipley (National).
Waitakere – chiefly, the abolished seat of West Auckland. Won by former Te Atatu MP Brian Neeson (National).
Wellington-Karori – the abolished Wellington Central seat, plus part of the abolished Ohariu seat. Won by new National MP Pauline Gardiner.

The seats of Gisborne, Hamilton East, Hamilton West, Hastings, Horowhenua, Invercargill, Lyttelton, Manawatu, Miramar, New Plymouth, Onehunga, Otara, Roskill, Te Atatu, Timaru, Titirangi, Tongariro, Wanganui and West Coast were won from the National Party by Labour challengers. Seventeen of these seats (Gisborne, Hamilton East, Hamilton West, Hastings, Horowhenua, Lyttelton, Manawatu, Miramar, New Plymouth, Onehunga, Otara, Roskill, Te Atatu, Titirangi, Tongariro, Wanganui & the West Coast) had been won by National from Labour in 1990, so were one-term National seats.
The seat of Auckland Central was won from the Labour Party by an Alliance challenger. The challenger was Sandra Lee and the defeated incumbent was Richard Prebble.
The seat of Northern Maori was won from the Labour Party by a New Zealand First challenger. The challenger was Tau Henare and the defeated incumbent was Bruce Gregory.
The seat of Awarua passed from an incumbent National MP to a new National MP.
The seat of Pencarrow passed from an incumbent Labour MP to a new Labour MP.

Post-election events
A number of local by-elections were required due to the resignation of incumbent local body politicians following their election to Parliament:

The by-election was won by Gordon Hodson.

Notes

References

 
November 1993 events in New Zealand